Xanbulaq may refer to:
 Xanbulaq, Agsu, a village and municipality in the Agsu Rayon of Azerbaijan
 Xanbulaq, Yardymli, a village in the municipality of Yeni Abdinli in the Yardymli Rayon of Azerbaijan